Bestwood St. Albans is a former civil parish in the Gedling borough of Nottinghamshire, England. According to the 2001 census it had a population of 4,950. At the time of the 2011 census the population had increased to 5,259. The parish included the Bestwood Village and Bestwood Lodge areas, as well as Warren Hill, Warren Wood, Deer Park and 'The Gardens' on the northern outskirts of the Greater Nottingham conurbation, but not the area of Nottingham itself known as Bestwood.

Bestwood St. Albans ceased to exist on 31 March 2018, after which date it was replaced by Bestwood Village parish and St Albans parish.

See also
Listed buildings in Bestwood St. Albans

References

External links
Now defunct Bestwood St. Albans Parish Council website
Bestwood Village Parish Council website
St. Albans Parish Council website

Former civil parishes in Nottinghamshire
Gedling